Estadio Las Victorias is a soccer stadium located in Chiquimula, Guatemala. It is home to second division club Sacachispas, and has a capacity of 9,000.

Las Victorias